UFC 190: Rousey vs. Correia was a mixed martial arts event held on August 1, 2015, at the HSBC Arena in Rio de Janeiro, Brazil.

Background
The event was headlined by a UFC Women's Bantamweight Championship bout between former UFC Bantamweight champion Ronda Rousey and #5 contender Bethe Correia.

The lightweight and bantamweight finals of The Ultimate Fighter: Brazil 4 also took place at this event. The finale was initially planned to take place on June 27, 2015 in São Paulo, Brazil. However, on May 15, the event was moved to the Seminole Hard Rock Hotel and Casino in Hollywood, Florida. It was expected to be the first time an Ultimate Fighter Brazil Finale would take place outside of Brazil. However, as the event approached, several international fighters experienced potential travel restrictions due to technical issues within the Bureau of Consular Affairs division of the U.S. State Department which produces visas. This led to a situation in which several participants might have been barred from being able to compete. Subsequently, the divisional finals of The Ultimate Fighter: Brazil 4 were shifted to this event.

The event featured a potential UFC Women's Strawweight Championship title eliminator bout between Cláudia Gadelha and former WSOF Women's Strawweight champion Jessica Aguilar.

The event fared well, receiving 900,000 pay-per-view buys.

Rousey dedicated her fight to 
"Rowdy" Roddy Piper who had died the day before.

Results

Bonus awards
The following fighters were awarded $50,000 bonuses:
Fight of the Night: Maurício Rua vs. Antônio Rogério Nogueria
Performance of the Night: Ronda Rousey and Demian Maia

See also
List of UFC events
2015 in UFC

References

Ultimate Fighting Championship events
2015 in mixed martial arts
Mixed martial arts in Brazil
International sports competitions in Rio de Janeiro (city)
2015 in Brazilian sport
August 2015 sports events in South America